The Czar and the Carpenter (German title:Zar und Zimmermann) is a 1956 East German musical comedy film directed by Hans Müller and starring Willy A. Kleinau, Bert Fortell and Lore Frisch. It is an adaptation of the opera Zar und Zimmermann by Albert Lortzing. It is set around the Russian Tsar Peter the Great's secret visit to the Dutch Republic to study shipbuilding in the seventeenth century.

Main cast
 Willy A. Kleinau: Van Bettt, Bürgermeister von Saardam
 Bert Fortell: Peter Michailow
 Lore Frisch: Marie
 Günther Haack: Peter Iwanow
 Walther Suessenguth: Admiral Lefort
 Erich Arnold: Marquis Charteauneuf
 Kurt Mühlhardt: Lord Syndham
 Paula Braend: Witwe Brouwe

External links

1956 films
1956 musical comedy films
German musical comedy films
East German films
1950s German-language films
Films directed by Hans Müller
Films based on operas
Films set in the 1690s
Films set in the Dutch Golden Age
Opera films
Cultural depictions of Peter the Great
Works about the Dutch East India Company
1950s German films